Ninoslav Saraga (born 3 January 1969 in Osijek) is a Croatian rower.

References 
 
 

1969 births
Living people
Croatian male rowers
Sportspeople from Osijek
Rowers at the 1992 Summer Olympics
Rowers at the 1996 Summer Olympics
Rowers at the 2000 Summer Olympics
Olympic rowers of Croatia

World Rowing Championships medalists for Croatia